Almondsbury Football Club is a football club based in Almondsbury, near Bristol, England.

History
The club was established in 1969 as Patchway North End, and were originally based in Patchway, before becoming Patchway Old Boys in 1971. In 1989 they relocated to nearby Almondsbury and were renamed Almondsbury Football Club. They were members of the Bristol & Suburban League until winning the league in 2000–01, earning promotion to the Gloucestershire County League.

In 2003–04 Almondsbury won the Gloucestershire County League title and were promoted to the Division One of the Western League. After partnering with the University of the West of England, the club were renamed Almondsbury UWE in 2009. They finished bottom of Division One in 2016–17, but were not relegated. In the summer of 2017 the club dropped "UWE" from their name. At the end of the 2017–18 season, they were transferred to Division One West of the Hellenic League. The club were transferred back to Division One of the Western League at the end of the following season.

Honours
Gloucestershire County League
Champions 2003–04
Bristol Suburban League
Premier Division champions 2000–01

Records
Best FA Cup performance: First qualifying round, 2012–13, 2015–16
Best FA Vase performance: Second round, 2018–19

See also
Almondsbury F.C. players
Almondsbury F.C. managers

References

External links
Official website

 
Football clubs in England
Football clubs in Gloucestershire
Football clubs in Bristol
Association football clubs established in 1969
1969 establishments in England
Bristol and Suburban Association Football League
Gloucestershire County Football League
Western Football League
Hellenic Football League